The 2019 World Rugby Under 20 Trophy was the twelfth annual international rugby union competition for Under 20 national teams, second-tier world championship.

The event was held at the Estádio Martins Pereira in São José dos Campos from 9 until 21 July and was organized by rugby's governing body, World Rugby.

Qualified teams 
A total of eight teams played in the tournament. The host  and the 2018 World Rugby Under 20 Championship relegation country  qualified automatically. The remaining six countries qualified through a qualification process in regional competitions (North America, South America, Europe, Africa, Asia, Oceania).

Host (1)
 
Relegated from 2018 JWC
 
Asia Rugby (1)
  
 Rugby Africa (1)
 

Sudamérica Rugby (1)
 
Rugby Americas North (1)
 
Rugby Europe (1)
 
Oceania Rugby (1)

Pool Stage

Pool A 
{| class="wikitable" style="text-align: center;"
|-
!width="200"|Team
!width="25"|Pld
!width="25"|W
!width="25"|D
!width="25"|L
!width="35"|PF
!width="35"|PA
!width="35"|PD
!width="25"|TF
!width="25"|TA
!width="25"|Pts
|- style="background:#BBF3BB;"
| align="left" |
| 3||3||0||0||150||89||+61||22||13||15
|-
| align="left" |
| 3||2||0||1||146||67||+79||22||9||11
|-
| align="left" |
| 3||1||0||2||71||135||−64||8||21||5
|-
| align="left" |
| 3||0||0||3||58||134||−76||9||18||2
|}

Pool B 
{| class="wikitable" style="text-align: center;"
|-
!width="200"|Team
!width="25"|Pld
!width="25"|W
!width="25"|D
!width="25"|L
!width="35"|PF
!width="35"|PA
!width="35"|PD
!width="25"|TF
!width="25"|TA
!width="25"|Pts
|- style="background:#BBF3BB;"
| align="left" |
| 3||3||0||0||148||51||+97||8||3||15
|-
| align="left" |
| 3||2||0||1||93||77||+16||14||6||10
|-
| align="left" |
| 3||1||0||2||124||101||+23||19||14||7
|-
| align="left" |
| 3||0||0||3||65||201||−136||9||30||1
|}

Finals 
 7th place

 5th place

 3rd place

 Final

References 

2019
2019 rugby union tournaments for national teams
rugby union
International rugby union competitions hosted by Brazil
São José dos Campos
World Rugby Under 20 Trophy
World Rugby Under 20 Trophy